The R.M.S. Titanic Maritime Memorial Act of 1986  is a United States Act of Congress that was passed to designate the wreck of the RMS Titanic as an international maritime memorial and to regulate the research, exploration and salvage of the wreckage.
The Act became law on October 21, 1986, when it was passed by the 99th United States Congress.

Background 
According to a 1985 report, the United States Congress was concerned about potential damage caused to the [[Wreck of the Titanic|Titanic'''s wreck]] caused by salvagers. The report found that:
"The R.M.S. Titanic, the ocean liner which sank on her maiden voyage after striking an iceberg on April 14, 1912, should be designated as an international maritime memorial to the men, women, and children who perished aboard her"
"The recent discovery of the R.M.S. Titanic, lying more than twelve thousand feet beneath the ocean surface, demonstrates the practical applications of ocean science and engineering"
"The R.M.S. Titanic, well preserved in the cold, oxygen-poor waters of the deep North Atlantic Ocean, is of major national and international cultural and historical significance, and merits appropriate international protection"
"The R.M.S. Titanic represents a special opportunity for deep ocean scientific research and exploration"

 Enactment 
Walter B. Jones, Sr. (the Democratic Congressman for North Carolina) oversaw the submission of a bill, HR 3272, to the House of Representatives on September 11, 1985. On October 29, the United States House Committee on Merchant Marine and Fisheries debated HR 3272, with the hearing discovering that the United States had no jurisdiction over the site of Titanic's wreck.  Even Canada, geographically closest to the wreck, would have had difficulty claiming legal jurisdiction as the wreck was deemed to be in "high seas".

On February 5, 1986, Jones championed a similar bill that was presented to the Senate, which proposed that until an international agreement could be negotiated, no individual would be permitted to physically alter, disturb, or salvage the wreckage. The Senate bill was signed by President Ronald Reagan on October 21, 1986, creating the RMS Titanic'' Maritime Memorial Act. The Act aimed to "encourage recognition of the wreck as a maritime memorial to those who lost their lives when it sank, to promote the development of an international agreement providing for the protection of the wreck, and to cultivate internationally recognized guidelines for research, exploration and, if appropriate, salvage activities."

Upon signing the bill, Reagan issued the following statement:

After the Act's passing, the Department of State proposed an agreement with the United Kingdom, Canada and France (as well as other interested countries) to enact the policies from the 1986 Act on an international scale. Known as the "Agreement Concerning the Shipwrecked Vessel R.M.S. Titanic", Canada and France did not ratify it, though the signature of only two countries is sufficient for the agreement to enter force – the United Kingdom ratified the agreement on November 6, 2003, and it was subsequently signed by the United States on June 18, 2004. The agreement went into effect in 2019, with the United States' ratification.

References

External links
 

99th United States Congress
1986 in American politics
United States federal admiralty and maritime legislation
RMS Titanic
1986 in law